The Carpathian goat is a usually white-coated breed from southeastern Europe (including Romania and Poland) is used for the production of meat and milk.

Sources

Goat breeds
Dairy goat breeds
Meat goat breeds